The Emigrants is the collective name of a series of four novels by the Swedish author Vilhelm Moberg:

The Emigrants (Swedish: Utvandrarna), 1949
Unto a Good Land (title in Swedish: Invandrarna 'The Immigrants'), 1952
The Settlers (Swedish: Nybyggarna), 1956
The Last Letter Home (title in Swedish: Sista brevet till Sverige 'The Last Letter to Sweden'), 1959

All the books have been translated into English. The novels are generally considered to be among the best pieces of Swedish literature.

Plot
The novel-series describes the long and strenuous journey for a party of emigrants from the province of Småland, Sweden, to the United States in 1850, coinciding with the beginning of the first significant wave of immigration to the United States from Sweden. The story focuses primarily on Karl Oskar Nilsson and his wife, Kristina Johansdotter, a young married couple who live with their four small children; Anna, Johan, Lill-Märta, and Harald, as well as Karl Oskar's parents and his rebellious younger brother Robert, who works as a hired farmhand for neighboring farmers. The family lives on a small farm at Korpamoen, where the soil is thin and rocky, making growing crops extremely difficult. It is Robert, together with his friend Arvid, who first comes across the prospect of going to America after being tired of being mistreated by the farmers who employ him. When he confronts Karl Oskar about the idea, Karl Oskar reveals that he too has come across pamphlets describing conditions in North America for farmers as being much better. Kristina, however, is adamantly against emigrating, not wanting to leave her homeland or wanting to risk the lives of her children by taking them across the ocean. However, things take yet another tragic turn for the family which causes Kristina to reconsider. In the winter of 1849, the family has very little food, but on the day of the christening of their youngest child, Harald, Kristina is preparing a large bowl of barley porridge. Their eldest child, four-year-old Anna, determined to have some even after being told she cannot, goes into the cellar where it is left to cool and helps herself to a very large amount of it, so much that she falls terribly ill from it. Karl Oskar and Kristina send for Beata, a healing woman from Idemo, who upon seeing Anna tells them that after consuming so much porridge, Anna's stomach had burst. The child lingers in agony through the night before dying early the following morning, after which Kristina agrees for them to make the journey to America (Minnesota).

In their preparation for their emigration to the United States, Karl Oskar, Kristina, their three remaining children and Robert are joined by Kristina's uncle and aunt, Danjel and Inga-Lena Andreasson and their four children. Danjel Andreasson is the pastor of a local conventicle of the Radical Pietistic Åkianer sect and has suffered relentless persecution at the hands of the Government-controlled Church of Sweden. For this reason, Danjel Andreasson seeks the religious freedom promised in the Constitution of the United States. He is joined by a member of his conventicle, Ulrika of Västergöhl, a former prostitute who seeking to start a new life in America for herself and her illegitimate teenage daughter Elin. Along with Ulrika and Elin, Danjel had also agreed to pay Arvid's passage to America after hiring him as a farmhand. The party was finally joined by Jonas Petter, a friend of Karl Oskar who was fleeing an unhappy marriage.

The party sets off by wagon for the Swedish port city of Karlshamn, on the Baltic Sea, where they board the brig Charlotta, bound for New York City, as emigrants.

Recognition
The novels have to date been sold in nearly two million copies in Sweden and have been translated into more than twenty languages.

Honours
The series was in a poll conducted by Biblioteket i fokus ("Library in focus") in 1997 voted as the best Swedish book of the 20th century by 27,000 people.
The series was in a poll conducted by Sveriges television in 1998 voted as the most important Swedish book of all time by 17,000 people.

Adaptations
Two movies based on the books were released in the 1970s, starring Max Von Sydow and Liv Ullmann as Karl Oskar and Kristina:
The Emigrants, a 1971 adaption by Jan Troell, based on the first two novels.
The New Land, a 1972 sequel to the first film, based on the last two novels.

Kristina från Duvemåla, a musical by former ABBA members Björn Ulvaeus and Benny Andersson, was produced in the 1990s. It was successful in Sweden and abroad.

A 2021 feature film adaptation, titled simply The Emigrants, was released in cinemas in December 2021, starring Gustaf Skarsgård, Lisa Carlehed and Tove Lo.

References

External links
Vilhelm Moberg - The Greatest Swedish Author

Novels by Vilhelm Moberg
Historical novels
Swedish migration to North America
Novel series
Novels set in Minnesota
Swedish-language novels
Novels about immigration to the United States
Works about Swedish-American culture
Book series introduced in 1949